Magdumpur also known as "Makhdumpur/Modumpally", is a village in Nangunoor Mandal of Siddipet district, Telangana, India.

References

Villages in Siddipet district